Televisão de Moçambique (TVM, lit. "Television of Mozambique") is the national public broadcaster of Mozambique. It is headquartered in Maputo, the country's capital. 

The station was launched in 1981 as Experimental Television of Mozambique (Televisão Experimental de Moçambique) with experimental programming aired on Sundays only. Gradually its broadcasting weekdays increased and it adopted its current name Television of Mozambique in 1991. In 2001 the station started broadcasting via satellite, reaching the entire country.

The network receives 60 percent of its operational financing from the government and the remaining 40 percent from advertisers and other commercial sources.

References

External links
 

Publicly funded broadcasters
Television channels in Mozambique
Portuguese-language television networks
Companies based in Maputo
Television channels and stations established in 1981
State media
1981 establishments in Mozambique